A Heeresfeldbahnlokomotive is the German term for a special wartime locomotive (Kriegslokomotive) for employment on military field railways (Heeresfeldbahnen), railways usually designed to transport military supplies to the front line.

Classes

Germany

Steam locomotives World War I
 Zwilling
 Brigadelokomotive

Steam locomotives World War II
(KDL = Kriegsdampflokomotive)
 HF 70 C (KDL 12)
 HF 110 C 
 HF 160 D (KDL 11)
 HF 210 E

Diesel locomotives World War II

(KML = Kriegsmotorlokomotive)
 HF 200 D
 HF 130 C (KML 3)
 HF 50 B (KML 4)
 HF 40 B (Industrie class Deutz OMZ 122 F for bridging the gap whilst the HF 50 B was being designed)

Preserved 
German Heeresfeldbahnlokomotiven preserved in Germany after the Second World War:

in Germany

Steam locomotives 
 HF 70 C (KDL 12)
 HF 110 C (JLKB Nos. 1, 4 and 5): Nicki + Frank S. (Slg. Seidensticker)
 HF 160 D (KDL 11)
 HF 210 E: Aquarius C (Slg. Seidensticker)

Diesel locomotives 
 HF 200 D: none
 HF 130 C (KML 3)
 HF 50 B (KML 4)

in Austria 
Many Heeresfeldbahnlokomotiven were left in Austria after the war; as a result many of these locomotives were used by Austrian railway companies.

Austrian Federal Railways (ÖBB)

Steam locomotives 
 ÖBB Class 798 (HF 110 C)
 ÖBB Class 699, 699.1 (HF 160 D)

Diesel locomotives 
 ÖBB Class 2092 (HF 130 C)

Salzkammergut-Lokalbahn (SKGLB)

Steam locomotives 
 SKGLB 19 (HF 160 D)
 SKGLB 22 (HF 210 E)
 SKGLB 32 (HF 110 C)
 SKGLB 33 (HF 110 C)

Diesel locomotives 
 SKGLB D 40 (HF 200 D)

in Poland

Diesel locomotives 
 Lx 164 (HF 200 D, Sochaczew narrow gauge museum)

in Namibia

Steam locomotives 
 Swakopmund-Windhuk Staatsbahn Zwillinge, Number 154A (154B is lost) on a plinth under a shelter outside Windhoek Station.

Military railways
Military locomotives of Germany
Preserved steam locomotives of Germany
Preserved diesel locomotives
Military railway equipment